is a village located in Shimajiri District, Okinawa Prefecture, Japan. It encompasses the island of Iheya.

As of October 2016, the village has an estimated population of 1,214 and the density of 56 persons per km². The total area is 21.72 km².

Education
 Iheya Junior High School (伊平屋中学校)
 Iheya Elementary School (伊平屋小学校)

Okinawa Prefectural Board of Education operates high schools elsewhere in the prefecture.

Notable residents 
On May 25, 1964, Hihei Shiroma of Iheya petitioned the United States House Committee on Foreign Affairs for the return of Okinawa to Japan, alongside Seigen Ukumoto of Nakazato, Okinawa and Heiryo Chibana of Yomitan, Okinawa, 8 years prior to the return of Okinawa to Japanese administrative control in 1972.

References

External links

 Village of Iheya 

Villages in Okinawa Prefecture